The Missouri Crematory (also known as Hillcrest Abbey Crematory and Mausoleum, Missouri Crematory and Columbarium and  Valhalla Hillcrest Abbey Crematory) was the sixth modern crematory built in the United States and holds the distinction of being the first crematory built west of the Mississippi River. The crematory is located at 3211 Sublette Avenue in St. Louis, just across from the State Mental Hospital off of Arsenal Street. Now called "Valhalla's Hillcrest Abbey" it is owned by the Zell Family, who also own the Valhalla Chapel and Memorial Park on St. Charles Rock Road.

Notable interments
 Pvt William Giles Hills (1841–1912), American Civil War Medal of Honor recipient
 Edward C. Kehr (1837–1918), US Representative
 Carman A. Newcomb (1830–1902), US Representative
 Walter Scott (1943–1983), singer
 Paul Tietjens (1877–1943) composer

Gallery

External links
 
 
 

Buildings and structures in St. Louis
Death in Missouri
Buildings and structures in Missouri